Wan'an Subdistrict is a subdistrict in Luojiang District, Quanzhou, Fujian, China. , it has 8 residential communities under its administration.

See also 
 List of township-level divisions of Fujian

References 

Township-level divisions of Fujian
Quanzhou